Dhumal is a surname of Indian origin. People with that name include:

 Dhumal (actor) (Anant Balwant Dhumal, 1914-1987), Bollywood actor
 Aditya Dhumal (born 1994), Indian cricketer for Mumbai
 Madhukar Dhumal (born 1960), Indian musician
 Nikit Dhumal (born 1991), Indian cricketer for Maharashtra
 Prem Kumar Dhumal (born 1944), Indian politician
 Yusuf Osman Dhumal (active from 1988), Somali military official

See also
 

Surnames of Indian origin